Copa Dinastías (2019) (Spanish for "The Dynasties Cup) is a professional wrestling held by the Mexican professional wrestling company Consejo Mundial de Lucha Libre (CMLL) from June 7 through June 21, 2019. For the tournament, eight tag teams competed in a single elimination tournament, with the preliminary rounds taking place on June 7 and 14, with the final match on June 21. All teams were made up of family members.

The finals came down to the father/son team of La Bestia del Ring and Rush facing Los Hermanos Chavez (The Chavez Brothers) Ángel de Oro and Niebla Roja. After three falls, Los Hermanos Chavez won the match and the cup.

Production

Background
For many Lucha libre is a family tradition, with second, third and fourth-generation wrestlers competing over the years. The Mexican professional wrestling company Consejo Mundial de Lucha Libre (CMLL; "World Wrestling Council") features a number of relatives on their roster and have for decades held various tournaments based on family relationships. The most widely promoted tournament is the La Copa Junior, a tournament for second, or more, generation wrestlers competing. In 1995, CMLL held a Second Generation Tag Team Tournament, where each team member was a second-generation wrestler, albeit not related to each other.

Storylines
The Copa Dinastías tournament featured various professional wrestling matches with different wrestlers involved in pre-existing scripted feuds, plots and storylines. Wrestlers were portrayed as either heels (referred to as rudos in Mexico, those that portray the "bad guys") or faces (técnicos in Mexico, the "good guy" characters) as they followed a series of tension-building events, which culminated in a wrestling match or series of matches.

Tournament participants
Ángel de Oro and Niebla Roja  brothers
La Bestia del Ring and Rush  father/son
Dragon Lee and Místico  brothers
Euforia and Soberano Jr.  father/son
El Felino and Negro Casas  brothers
Gran Guerrero and Último Guerrero  brothers
Máscara Año 2000 and Sansón  uncle/nephew
Volador Jr. and Flyer uncle/nephew

Tournament brackets

Super Viernes shows

June 7, 2019

June 14, 2019

June 21, 2019

References

2019 in Mexico
2019 in professional wrestling
Consejo Mundial de Lucha Libre tournaments
Events in Mexico City